Palm nut can refer to:

The fruit of the oil palm (Elaeis) tree
The fruit or seed of any palm tree (Arecaceae)
The immature fruits of Arenga pinnata, a canned/bottled food sold commercially in syrup